Emmanouel Pappas (1772–1821) was a prominent member of Filiki Eteria and leader of the Greek War of Independence in Macedonia.

Biography
Pappas was born in Dovista (Δοβίστα), Serres regional unit, a village which is now named after him (Emmanouil Papas). Son of a priest, Pappas excelled in commerce and banking, not only in Macedonia, but also in Europe, establishing trading posts in Constantinople, Vienna and Budapest, despite the limited education he received.

Being one of the founding members of Filiki Etaireia, after the outbreak of the War, he dedicated his fortune to organising and financing guerrilla troops. In March, 1821, he tried to coordinate his actions in Eastern Macedonia, with Anastasios Karatasos, who had started the revolution in West, with a view to spread it through the entire region, but their actions were not well synchronized, and had little success.

The Revolution in Macedonia
In Spring of 1821, he led 4,000 Macedonian fighters and landed to Chalkidiki, in Agion Oros, where on May 23 he started the Revolution, after all the leaders where grouped in the Koutloumousiou monastery. Quickly, the rise spread to Polygyros, Arnaia, Ormylia, Sithonia, and the area of Kalamaria.

Pappas was then named Leader and Defender of Macedonia and divided his force in two parts, the first under his leadership, moved towards Apollonia in order to intercept Ottoman forces moving from Constantinople and the second under Stamos Kapsas, through Arnaia and the mount Cholomon, reached Sedes outside Thessaloniki.  After some impressive accomplishments in the beginning, where he managed to liberate the most part of the peninsula and even to threaten Thessaloniki, his lack of communication with Karatassos and the propinquity of Chalkidiki to Thessaloniki, where massive Ottoman troops were stationed, enabled the Ottomans to move against him with large forces.

At first, Kapsas, not having enough forces to advance, retreated to Vasilika, Thessaloniki near the monastery of Saint Anastasia, where he was outflanked and overrun by superior Ottoman forces. Kapsas chose not to leave but to fight and with 68 men he put up a desperate struggle of which none survived.

Pappas was then forced to withdraw in Pallene and entrench in the ruins of ancient Potidaea, where on October 30 he was attacked by a 14,000 men corps, led personally by Mehmed Emin Pasha, Vali of Thessaloniki. Despite his efforts, the town was seized and burned, alongside many villages, however Pappas, on November with many locals, managed to sail towards Hydra, but during his trip he died of a heart attack. His defeat, along with the repression of Karatassos' revolution in Naoussa in April, 1822 marked the end of the Greek war of independence in North Greece. He is considered one of the most significant members of the Greek Revolution, being proclaimed hero of the Greek nation, during the First National Assembly at Epidaurus.

See also
Greek War of Independence
List of Macedonians (Greek)

References

Vakalopoulos, Apostolos E. "History of Macedonia 1354–1833", Vanias Press (1984). 
Vakalopoulos, Apostolos E. "Histoire De La Grece Moderne", Horvath Press. .
Paroulakis, Peter H., "The Greeks: Their Struggle For Independence”, Hellenic International Press (1984). .
Stratiki, Poti, “To Athanato 1821”, Stratikis Bros, (1990). .

External links
History of Macedonia 1354-1833

1772 births
1821 deaths
People from Emmanouil Pappas
Greek military leaders of the Greek War of Independence
Macedonian revolutionaries (Greek)
Members of the Filiki Eteria